Pontus Widén (10 November 1920 – 10 May 1983) was a Swedish bandy player and sports executive. He was chairman of Västerås SK 1955–1959, chairman of Västmanlands Bandyförbund 1957–1967, chairman of Swedish Bandy Association 1970–1983, and president for the International Bandy Federation 1978–1983.

References

Federation of International Bandy presidents
Swedish bandy executives
Swedish bandy players
1920 births
1983 deaths
Västerås SK Bandy players